Gianluca Mager was the defending champion but chose not to defend his title.

Jaume Munar won the title after defeating Pedro Cachín 6–2, 6–2 in the final.

Seeds

Draw

Finals

Top half

Bottom half

References

External links
Main draw
Qualifying draw

Andalucía Challenger - 1